Frederikus Johannes (Eric) Braamhaar (born 13 October 1966 in Rijssen) is a Dutch football referee. Braamhaar is known to have served as a FIFA referee during the period from 2003 to 2011. He officiated at the 2003 FIFA U-17 World Championship and 2005 FIFA World Youth Championship, as well as qualifying matches for the 2006 and 2010 World Cups.

He refereed the 2007 UEFA Champions League knockout stage match between Manchester United and Lille OSC.  There was some controversy as Braamhaar allowed United's Ryan Giggs to take the free-kick and score before Lille goalkeeper Tony Sylva had assembled the defensive wall; Lille's players threatened to walk off the pitch leading them to be charged with improper conduct by UEFA. Four weeks later, while refereeing an Eredivisie, he was seen celebrating when Ajax scored their fifth goal in a 5–1 victory over PSV Eindhoven. PSV manager Ronald Koeman, thought he was celebrating the goal, but Braamhaar later explained that he celebrated because of his decision to play advantage after an Ajax player was fouled in the build-up.

On 26 April 2007, he left the pitch during the UEFA Cup semi final between Osasuna and Sevilla due to a torn calf muscle. He was replaced by fourth official Pieter Vink.

Personal
He lives in Enter in the province of Overijssel.

References

1966 births
Living people
Dutch football referees
People from Rijssen
Sportspeople from Overijssel